Bad Cat is a 2016 Turkish adult computer-animated action comedy film directed by Mehmet Kurtuluş and Ayşe Ünal. The film is based on the comic strip Kötü Kedi Şerafettin by Bülent Üstün. This is an independent movie and this work was self-funded, with some of the budget raised through product placements. It was featured and became the first animated Turkish film and the first comic's adaptation from Turkey to be shown at the Annecy International Animation Film Festival in 2016. After the film's television premiere took place on 1 July 2017 in Turkey, the Radio and Television Supreme Council fined the Kanal D television channel for airing this adult animation, which has a cat character who is a smoker and an alcoholic.

A game based on the film, titled The Bad Cat, was released on mobile devices shortly after the film's release.

Plot
Shero, a crass and short-tempered cat owned by a man named Tank, has sent his associates, Rifki the seagull and Riza the rat, to obtain liquor for a barbecue that night. Another cat, Black, informs Shero of an attractive Siamese cat named Princess in a nearby apartment. When her cartoonist owner leaves for work, Shero and Black sneak into the apartment to seduce Princess, but she accidentally kills herself in a panic. The cartoonist returns home to find Princess dead and furiously attacks Shero and Black. Black is killed, and Shero engages the cartoonist in a fight that results in the cartoonist's death when they both tumble out the window. On his way back home, Shero meets a young cat named Taco, who claims to be Shero's illegitimate son. Shero rejects Taco and goes to steal some fish from Hazel, Tank's landlady. Hazel retaliates by threatening Tank with eviction unless he can cover months of unpaid rent by the next day. An angered Tank ejects Shero from his home and blocks every possible entrance. While smoking and sulking, Shero witnesses a beautiful Angora cat named Misscat being harassed by a pair of dogs and rescues her by beating her assailants. Shero attempts to seduce Misscat but is turned down and told to meet her again on the same rooftop that night. Meanwhile, the brainless cadaver of the cartoonist is revived by an ambulance defibrillator. The cartoonist hijacks the ambulance and begins a vengeful search for Shero.

As Shero obtains a bouquet for Misscat, the cartoonist finds the two dogs and forces them to lead him to Shero; Taco, who was rummaging for food, witnesses this transaction and follows them. Shero and Misscat rendezvous and prepare to make love when they are captured and tied up by the dogs and the cartoonist. Before the cartoonist can electrocute Shero, Taco appears and frees Shero, who fights the cartoonist and throws him off the building and into a dumpster, along with the dogs. Taco is once again brushed off by Shero, and he reveals that his mother, a past mate of Shero's named Mimosa, is dead. Shero and Taco bond after a brief exchange of fists and Taco helps Shero attempt to obtain liquor from the local grocer. However, the cartoonist, having hijacked a passing garbage truck, absconds with Taco during the mission, forcing Shero into a chase. Shero rescues Taco as the garbage truck plunges into the sea, and Shero once more kills the cartoonist in an underwater fight. As Shero and Taco make their return home, Hazel chases off Misscat and installs barbed wire to further prevent Shero's entry. The cartoonist's body is lifted out of the sea by a rescue team, and he is once again revived when his body comes into contact with power wires.

After Rifki and Riza's latest attempt to retrieve liquor ends in failure, Riza proposes to Shero that they can all get what they want by robbing a bank. The cartoonist is apprehended by the police, but he hijacks the police car when the bank's robbery is reported. As Shero and the group make their getaway, Taco takes a bullet for Shero from the cartoonist. Shero, believing Taco to be dead, discards the stolen money into a crowd of people in his grief, and he leaves with Taco's body in the confusion. Tank comes across Shero and Taco and takes them back home in the absence of available veterinarians. Tank and Shero successfully treat Taco's bullet wound and revive him, and Rifki and Riza return with a single pack of money from the robbery, which is used to clear all of Shero and Tank's debts. The last of the money is used to hold Shero's barbecue. The celebration is cut short by the arrival of the cartoonist, who has taken Misscat hostage. Shero and Tank engage in one last fight against the cartoonist and finally destroy him in a gas explosion. Shero and Misscat watch the fireworks and confess their love for each other. They then have sex, and end up bouncing across the world as the credits roll.

Cast

Uğur Yücel (Don Battee in the English version) as Şerafettin / Shero
Demet Evgar as:
Tacettin / Taco, Shero's illegitimate son.
Misket / Misscat, Shero's love interest.
Okan Yalabık as:
The Cartoonist, an unnamed man who is killed by Shero in self-defense following the accidental death of his cat Princess, whom he seeks to avenge after being reanimated.
Adnan, a bulldog.
Güven Kıraç as Rıza, a rat.
Gökçe Özyol as Rıfkı, a seagull.
Ahmet Mümtaz Taylan as Tonguç / Tank, Shero's owner.
Yekta Kopan as Cemil / Black
Ayşen Gruda as Hasene / Hazel
Cezmi Baskın as Şemistan / Semi, a grocer.
Ozan Kurtuluş as:
Kopek - Adnan's teammate
An ambulance officer
Bülent Üstün as Mertan, a seagull.
Ayşe Ünal as an ambulance officer
Mehmet Kurtuluş as a commissioner
Turgut Doğru as a police officer

Development and release 
Bad Cat was an adaptation of the Turkish comic book series of the same name by Bülent Üstün. It was produced by Anima Istanbul. The film's producers were Mehmet Kurtuluş and Vehbi Berksoy. Australia-based Odin's Eye Entertainment has acquired worldwide rights to this film at Cannes 2015. The film was attended work-in-progress session during Annecy 2015. The film went on general release across Turkey on February 5, 2016. The film was included New Turkish Cinema sections of the 35th Istanbul Film Festival. In June, it will participate in Annecy 2016 in the category "Feature Films out of competition".

The film was released in cinemas on February 5, 2016 in Turkey with the original Turkish dubbing, February 2, 2017 in Panama with Panamanian Spanish dubbing, July 11, 2018 in Argentina with Spanish dubbing, August 9, 2018 in the Middle East with English dubbing, October 18, 2018 in Portugal with Portuguese dubbing, February 12, 2021 in India with English dubbing. The film was released on DVD and Blu-ray on September 6, 2017 in Benelux with French dubbing. The film was dubbed in Polish in 2017 and screened on Cinemax Polska on August 25, 2017. In 2017, film was dubbed in Persian in Iran for Video on Demand. The film was dubbed in Brazilian Portuguese in 2019 and screened on Telecine on January 10, 2020. The film was released on DVD on September 15, 2021 in Japan with Japanese dubbing. The film was released for VOD in Russia on December 6, 2021 with Russian dubbing. In 2022, film was dubbed in Spanish and Catalan in Spain and Catalonia for Video on Demand.

Award and nominations

References

External links

  
 

2016 computer-animated films
Animated films based on comics
Animated films about cats
Animated films about revenge
Films about mice and rats
Turkish animated films
2010s Turkish-language films
2016 animated films
2016 films
Adult animated films
Films based on Turkish comics
Adult animated comedy films